José Segrelles Albert (18 March 1885 - 3 March 1969) was a Spanish painter and illustrator. He was the uncle of cartoonists and painters Eustaquio and Vicente Segrelles.

Biography
Segrelles was born in Albaida, Valencia province, in 1885. He studied in the Saint Charles Royal Academy of Fine Arts of Valencia and at Escola de la Llotja in Barcelona. His first job was in a photography studio, working with illumination.

In 1926, already established as an artist in Spain, Segrelles received his first English lessons, foreseeing a possible departure to England. That very year he made an exhibition in London which was poorly received but on 8 September 1926 he received an offer from British magazines The Illustrated London News and The Sketch. Due his appearances in The Sketch, Segrelles received offers from Scandinavian press. He published in The Illustrated London Newss Christmas special in 1927, being a regular contributor in the Christmas specials until 1934.

In 1927 he established contacts with the American publishing industry, and received an offer the following year. Segrelles relocated to the Upper West Side, New York City in October, 1928. His first job was for Redbook magazine, and he would work also for The Cosmopolitan. In 1930 he staged his first art exhibition exhibition. By this time Cosmopolitan was one of the most popular magazines in America, highlighting Segrelles' work alongside other illustrators such as James Montgomery Flagg. In 1930 Segrelles  met Joanne Cummings, Miss Cummings, who became his model.

In 1931, Segrelles exhibited at International Art Center Roerich Museum. US press coined the term Blue Segrelles referring to his dark pallette. The term was a comparison to Maxfield Parrish's Blue Parrish.

He died in his hometown of Albaida in 1969.

See also 
 List of Orientalist artists
 Orientalism
 Segrelles Museum
 Vicente Segrelles

References

Bibliography

External links

 
Website dedicated to José Segrelles

1885 births
1969 deaths
19th-century Spanish painters
19th-century Spanish male artists
20th-century Spanish painters
20th-century Spanish male artists
Orientalist painters
People from Vall d'Albaida
Spanish male painters